Spirito Santo alla Ferratella is a titular church for a cardinal-priest and parish church in Rome, dedicated to the Holy Spirit.

Church
Located at Via Rocco Scotellaro 11, Roma, Roma, Lazio 00144 (near Viale Cesare Pavese), in the southern prefecture, in the Pope's own Diocese of Rome.

It was built for a Holy Spirit parish founded on 1 December 1981, which is pastorally served by the Rosminians.

Pope John Paul II visited the church on 16 April 1989.

On 28 June 1988, it was established as titular church for a cardinal of the rank of Cardinal-Priest.

List
 Vincentas Sladkevičius, M.I.C. (28 June 1988 – 28 May 2000) 
 Ivan Dias (21 February 2001 – 19 June 2017)
 Ignatius Suharyo Hardjoatmodjo (5 October 2019 – present)

References

External links
 GCatholic Cardinal title
 GCatholic church

Titular churches
Churches in the Metropolitan City of Rome Capital